Malu is a suburban town in Jiading District, Shanghai, China.  Its population is about 51,000 inhabitants.

Due to the location, Malu has been able to exceed in many industries such as electronics, fashion design, machinery, pharmaceutics and food. World standard infrastructures and quality auxiliary facilities provide a good environment for investors from around the world nowadays.

References

Towns in Shanghai